Mohammad Yustedjo Tarik (born 30 August 1953), known as Yustedjo Tarik or Tedjo, is an Indonesian former professional tennis player. He was the 1979 Southeast Asian Games and 1982 Asian Games singles champion.

Davis Cup career
Born and raised in Jakarta, Tarik made his debut for the Indonesia Davis Cup team in 1973. During his Davis Cup career, which spanned 14-years, he had wins in 13 singles rubbers, one of which was over India's Anand Amritraj in 1981.

Tarik was a member of the Indonesia team that won the Eastern Zone in 1982 and the following year made appearances in the World Group, including against a Sweden side featuring Mats Wilander.

See also
List of Indonesia Davis Cup team representatives

References

External links
 
 
 

1953 births
Living people
Indonesian male tennis players
Sportspeople from Jakarta
Medalists at the 1978 Asian Games
Medalists at the 1982 Asian Games
Tennis players at the 1978 Asian Games
Tennis players at the 1982 Asian Games
Asian Games gold medalists for Indonesia
Asian Games medalists in tennis
Southeast Asian Games medalists in tennis
Southeast Asian Games gold medalists for Indonesia
Southeast Asian Games silver medalists for Indonesia
Competitors at the 1977 Southeast Asian Games
Competitors at the 1979 Southeast Asian Games
Competitors at the 1981 Southeast Asian Games
Competitors at the 1983 Southeast Asian Games